Central Highlands Province was an electorate of the Legislative Council of Victoria, Australia.  It existed as a two-member electorate from 1976 to 2006, with members holding alternating eight-year terms. It was a safe seat for the Liberal Party for most of its history, but was a surprise gain for the Labor Party in their landslide victory at the 2002 state election. The electorate was abolished in the Bracks Labor government's reform of the Legislative Council.

It covered a broad area of the state between the outer fringes of Melbourne and the Victorian Alps. In 2002, when it was last contested, it covered an area of 24,164 km2 and included the towns and suburbs of Alexandra, Benalla, Bright, Broadford, Coldstream, Diamond Creek, Euroa, Healesville, Hurstbridge, Lilydale, Mansfield, Marysville, Mount Beauty, Plenty, Seymour, Yan Yean, Yarra Glen and Yea.

Members for Central Highlands Province

Election results

Former electoral provinces of Victoria (Australia)
1976 establishments in Australia
2006 disestablishments in Australia